Sibylline is a Belgian comics series by Raymond Macherot and his second best-known work after Chlorophylle. Just like the latter, it is a fantasy comic about anthropomorphic animals in a forest setting. However, here the protagonist is a female mouse named Sibylline.

Concept

Sibylline is a  female mouse who lives in the forest Bosquet Jojeux, which is an anthropomorphic version of real city life. Much like Chlorophylle the stories appear to be a cartoon animal fantasy strip, but in fact have a darker, satirical edge. As the series progressed more fantastical elements started to occur, such as ghosts, wizards and vampires.

Characters
 Sibylline: The star of the series. She is a gentle, clever and brave female mouse, but can be jealous and hot-headed. Originally she lived in a house, but later she moved to the forest. She wears a yellow bonnet and a blue dress. 
 Taboum: Her dim-witted husband, who is very clumsy and a male version of the damsel in distress. Just like her, he is a mouse. 
 Flouzemaker: A crow who is a cigar-smoking business man. 
 Brigadier Verboten: A strict and authoritarian hedgehog who guards the forest. He wears a paper hat and a sheriff's badge. His last name is a pun on the German word for "Forbidden".
 Anathème Percemiche: The major antagonist of the series. He is a rat who is related to Anthracite, the antagonist from Macherot's other series, Chlorophylle. Anathème debuted in"Sibylline et l'imposteur".
 The small circus: A circus company who frequently travels to Sibylline's home place. It is composed of Gloglo, a parakeet who is a ventriloquist; Alphonse a dog who pulls their mobile home forth, Gustave a rabbit who is an equilibrist and  Gougoui the mouse, who tames butterflies.  
 Patakes: A duck who works as a reporter for "La Trompette Fureteuse". 
 Pantoufle: A cat who tries to eat Sibylline and her friends, but always fails. He was later given his own comics spin-off, under the script of René Goscinny. 
 Burokratz: A vampire who enjoys stealing cakes. 
 Zabagor: A white bird who can play the violin. He does this so well that it scares Burokratz the vampire.
 Pistolard: A fox who is a magician. 
 Croque-Monsieur: A ferret, who is another major antagonist. He is the evilest of all villains and actually murders animals to eat them. His name is a pun on the snack Croque-monsieur.

History

In 1964 Raymond Macherot left Tintin, where he had drawn Chlorophylle for many years. Contractually he was unable to take his characters with him, except for the antagonist Anthracite, whom he kept. In 1965 he created the series Sybilline for the rival magazine Spirou. The tone and atmosphere were very similar to Chlorophylle. Scripts were written by Macherot and Paul Deliège. After Macherot quit drawing Taymans took over. The series ran in Spirou until 1990. In 2006 the series was relaunched by André Taymans and François Corteggiani.

In popular culture

In the Belgian Comic Strip Center in Brussels the permanent exhibition brings homage to the pioneers of Belgian comics, among them Raymond Macherot. In the room dedicated to his work, everything is designed to look like a Chlorophylle and Sybilline's underground home in the forest.

Sibylline is among the many Belgian comics characters to jokingly have a Brussels street named after them. Since 2007 the Place Saint-Jean/ Sint-Jansplein has a commemorative plaque with the name Place Sibylline placed under the actual street sign.

References

External links
 Sibylline - BD, informations, cotes
 bdoubliees.com

Belgian comic strips
1965 comics debuts
Comics characters introduced in 1965
1990 comics endings
2006 comics debuts
Comics about women
Comics about animals
Comics about mice and rats
Comics set in forests
Fantasy comics
Adventure comics
Humor comics
Satirical comics
Fictional mice and rats
Anthropomorphic animal characters
Belgian comics characters
Dupuis titles
Female characters in comics